Bulbophyllum sect. Xiphizusa is a section of the genus Bulbophyllum. It is one of six Bulbophyllum sections found in the Americas.

Description
Species in this section have unifoliate pseudobulbs, inflorescence with a thin rachis holding flowers that are distichously arranged. Lateral sepals united to form a synsepal and petals are erect.  Column foot with entire apex and shorter than the length of the column.

Distribution
Plants from this section are found from Mexico down to Brazil, Bolivia, Paraguay, and Venezuela.

Species
Bulbophyllum section Xiphizusa comprises the following species:

References

Orchid subgenera